Alexey Shmidt (born 17 April 1983) is a Russian former professional road and track cyclist. He competed in the madison event at the 2004 Summer Olympics. He also competed in the madison event at the 2010 UCI Track Cycling World Championships.

He tested positive for EPO in September 2015 from a retested sample taken in November 2011.

Major results

Track

2001
 European Junior Championships
1st  Points race
2nd  Team pursuit
 2nd  Madison, European Under-23 Championships
 3rd  Team pursuit, UCI Junior World Championships
2002
 2nd  Scratch, European Under-23 Championships
2003
 European Under-23 Championships
2nd  Madison
2nd  Team pursuit
2004
 3rd  Team pursuit, European Under-23 Championships
 3rd Team pursuit, Moscow, UCI World Cup Classics
2005
 European Championships
1st  Derny
3rd  Madison
2006
 UCI World Cup Classics
2nd Madison, Moscow
3rd Madison, Los Angeles
3rd Team pursuit, Los Angeles
2009
 3rd Madison, Manchester, UCI World Cup Classics

Road

2005
 1st Grand Prix of Moscow
 1st Stage 1b Five Rings of Moscow
 3rd Overall Grand Prix of Sochi
1st Stages 2 & 3
2006
 1st Stage 3 Tour of Hainan
 5th Overall Tour of South China Sea
 5th Boucle de l'Artois
 10th Paris–Troyes
2007
 1st Overall Grand Prix of Sochi
1st Stage 2
 1st Stage 1a Tour de Serbie
 10th Overall Five Rings of Moscow
1st Stage 1a (ITT)
2009
 5th Overall Five Rings of Moscow
 5th Memorial Oleg Dyachenko
2010
 1st Tour de Ribas
2011
 5th Univest Grand Prix
2012
 2nd Overall Tour of America's Dairyland
1st Stage 8
 2nd Clarendon Cup

References

External links
 
 
 
 
 
 
 

1983 births
Living people
Russian track cyclists
Russian male cyclists
People from Khimki
Cyclists at the 2004 Summer Olympics
Olympic cyclists of Russia
Doping cases in cycling